Sir Hugh Thomas Dyke Acland  (10 September 1874 – 15 April 1956) was a New Zealand surgeon.

Early life
He was born in 1874 in Christchurch. Acland was one of the first doctors in New Zealand who confined their medical practice to surgery. He joined the New Zealand Medical Corps for World War I and survived the sinking of the SS Marquette in 1915.

In 1924, Acland bought Chippenham Lodge in Browns Road, St Albans, which had previously belonged to John Evans Brown. His family lived there for the rest of his life.

Local politics
Acland was elected to the North Canterbury Hospital Board in 1927 and remained a member for the following 17 years. He contested the election for Mayor of Christchurch in 1935 and was narrowly beaten by the incumbent, Labour's Dan Sullivan. The election attracted nationwide attention, as Christchurch was a Labour-stronghold and due to Acland's widespread popularity, it was regarded as a test whether Labour could potentially win the November 1935 general election (which it did). Acland was elected as a councillor to Christchurch City Council in 1936 and served until 1941.

Honours and awards
In 1917, Acland was appointed an additional Companion of the Order of St Michael and St George, in recognition of valuable services in connection with World War I. In the 1919 King's Birthday Honours, he was made a Companion of the Order of the British Empire, also for war services. Acland was appointed a Knight Bachelor in the 1933 King's Birthday Honours. In 1935, he was awarded the King George V Silver Jubilee Medal, and in 1953 he received the Queen Elizabeth II Coronation Medal.

Death and commemoration
Acland died in 1956 at Chippenham Lodge. Acland Avenue in Avonside is named for Acland. This short cul-de-sac is located in the residential red zone.

Notes

References

1874 births
1956 deaths
Hugh 1874
New Zealand surgeons
Medical doctors from Christchurch
Christchurch City Councillors
New Zealand Knights Bachelor
New Zealand Companions of the Order of St Michael and St George
New Zealand Commanders of the Order of the British Empire
Sinking of the SS Marquette
New Zealand military personnel of World War I
20th-century New Zealand medical doctors
Members of district health boards in New Zealand
Fellows of the Royal College of Surgeons
Ormond family
Harper family